"PPP" is a song by American dream pop band Beach House, from the band's fifth studio album, Depression Cherry. The song was released as a single, along with "Beyond Love" on August 6, 2015.

Description
The acronym "PPP" is thought to refer to "Piss Poor Planning", as the song is utilized as an embodiment to demonstrate a relationship built with zero thought, and lacking structure, although the band themselves have never confirmed this. Victoria Legrand uses lyrics such as "like tracing figure eights on ice in skates" to express the perfection and beauty that the honeymoon phase of a relationship will shower one with, but proceeds that line with "But if this ice should break it would by my- my mistake", depicting things falling through with the little construction which the said relation was built upon.

Initial Reception
Upon release, "PPP" was profiled by publications such as Pitchfork Media, and Stereogum, who described the song as "gorgeous". The song has also been described as dreamy, other-worldly, or floaty, giving listeners a levitation-like experience when listening. As of March 2022, the song has been streamed over 40 million times on the popular music streaming service Spotify.

Composition
At just over 6 minutes, at 6:08 in length, "PPP" is written in 6/8 time, and in the key of D♭.

Citations

2015 singles
2015 songs
Beach House songs